Mozahar Hossain (?–2016) was a Bangladeshi politician and the former Member of Parliament from Panchagarh-2.

Career
Hossain was elected to Parliament from Panchagarh-2 as a Communist Party of Bangladesh candidate in 1991. He later joined Bangladesh Nationalist Party and was re-elected as a BNP candidate in 1996 and 2001. He served as the President of Panchagarh District unit of Bangladesh Nationalist Party.

Death
Hossain died on 3 October 2016.

References

5th Jatiya Sangsad members
6th Jatiya Sangsad members
7th Jatiya Sangsad members
8th Jatiya Sangsad members
2016 deaths
Bangladesh Nationalist Party politicians
Year of birth missing
People from Panchagarh District